Westringia cremnophila, commonly known as Snowy River westringia,  is a flowering plant in the family Lamiaceae, a rare shrub that is endemic to Victoria, Australia. It is a small shrub with leaves mostly in groups of three and white flowers.

Description
Flowering occurs in spring.

Taxonomy and naming
Westringia cremnophila was first formally described in 1957 by botanist Norman Wakefield and the description was published  in The Victorian Naturalist based on a type specimen collected from "Porphory cliffs above Snowy River, east of Butchers Ridge". The specific epithet (cremnophila) is in reference to its "habitat".

Distribution and habitat
Snowy river westringia  is restricted to Tulloch Ard Gorge in the  Snowy River National Park in East Gippsland, where it grows on cliff faces above the Snowy River with a north to north-east aspect. Associated plant species include shrubby platysace (Platysace lanceolata), violet daisy-bush (Olearia iodochroa), digger's speedwell (Veronica perfoliata), common fringe-myrtle (Calytrix tetragona) and tall baeckea (Sannantha pluriflora).

Conservation status and measures
 Westringia cremnophila is listed as "vulnerable" under the Commonwealth Environment Protection and Biodiversity Conservation Act 1999. 

After previously being listed as "vulnerable" (as of 2014) on the Advisory List of Rare Or Threatened Plants In Victoria and under the Flora and Fauna Guarantee Act 1988 (Vic.), Westringia cremnophila is since October 2021 and  listed as "Endangered" .

Due to the species' restricted habitat in difficult terrain, plants have proved difficult to find over the years, but in 2011 about 500 plants were located. Only around 60 individuals (12%) of the former population of 500 plants remained after the 2019–2020 bushfires.  Plants have been propagated and established at the Royal Botanic Gardens Melbourne as an insurance population.

References

cremnophila
Flora of Victoria (Australia)
Taxa named by Norman Arthur Wakefield
Plants described in 1957
Lamiales of Australia